Tom Papley (born 13 July 1996) is an Australian rules footballer playing for the Sydney Football Club in the Australian Football League (AFL).
He was drafted with pick 14 in the 2016 rookie draft.

AFL career
Papley made his AFL debut in round 1 of the 2016 AFL season against the Collingwood Football Club, kicking three goals. He earned the Rising Star nomination for round 5 following an impressive display against the West Coast Eagles in which he kicked two goals, earned 20 possessions, had six inside-50s and took eight marks in a match played in wet weather. Arguably his best season was in 2019, impressing many after the absence of Lance Franklin when he tied in 14th for goalkickers, with 37 goals. He kicked 4 goals against North Melbourne and 5 goals against the West Coast Eagles, proving to be two of his best performances.  But throughout the year, Papley had a desire to return home back to Victoria despite being contracted to the Swans until 2023 and was heavily linked to both Carlton and North Melbourne. During the trade period, he requested a trade to Carlton, but Papley wasn't given his wish as the trade didn't go through. Papley was selected to play for Victoria in the State Of Origin Bushfire Relief game, where he kicked 5 goals.

Papley played all 17 games of the 2020 AFL season, kicking 26 goals and leading the Swan's goalkicking tally for the second year in a row. His standout performance came against Hawthorn in Round 8, kicking 4 goals and sparking Sydney to a 7 point victory.

Papley rose to new heights in the 2021 AFL season, with a career-high 41 goals. This included four-goal performances against Richmond, GWS and Essendon, and the match-winning goal against Geelong in round 7. Papley was rewarded with his first ever All-Australian jumper in the 2021 All-Australian team, confirming his status as one of the competition's premier small forwards.

Papley missed the first six rounds of the 2022 season due to a preseason hamstring injury he suffered in a practice match with GWS. Despite the late start to the season he was awarded with being a member of the All-Australian Squad in 2022.

Family
His grandfathers, Jeff Bray and Max Papley, were teammates with the South Melbourne Swans from 1964 to 1966, before the team's move to Sydney. Tom Papley wore number 41 for his first two seasons, but following the retirement of Jeremy Laidler after the 2017 season Papley was able to take on number 11, the number Max Papley wore for 45 of his 59 matches with the South Melbourne Swans.

Two of Papley's cousins, Ben Ross and Michael Ross, have also recently played in the AFL.

Statistics
Updated to the end of the 2022 season.

|- 
| 2016 ||  || 41
| 20 || 29 || 15 || 141 || 102 || 243 || 57 || 72 || 1.5 || 0.8 || 7.1 || 5.1 || 12.2 || 2.9 || 3.6 || 0
|-
| 2017 ||  || 41
| 20 || 30 || 19 || 193 || 119 || 312 || 67 || 86 || 1.5 || 0.9 || 9.7 || 6.0 || 15.6 || 3.4 || 4.3 || 0
|- 
| 2018 ||  || 11
| 20 || 24 || 23 || 169 || 104 || 273 || 65 || 58 || 1.2 || 1.1 || 8.4 || 5.2 || 13.7 || 3.2 || 2.9 || 0
|-
| 2019 ||  || 11
| 22 || 37 || 28 || 241 || 99 || 340 || 106 || 62 || 1.7 || 1.3 || 10.9 || 4.5 || 15.4 || 4.8 || 2.8 || 4
|- 
| 2020 ||  || 11
| 17 || 26 || bgcolor=CAE1FF| 27† || 148 || 52 || 200 || 57 || 29 || 1.5 || 1.6 || 8.7 || 3.1 || 11.8 || 3.4 || 1.7 || 6
|-
| 2021 ||  || 11
| 23 || 43 || 27 || 230 || 83 || 313 || 89 || 34 || 1.9 || 1.2 || 10.0 || 3.6 || 13.6 || 3.9 || 1.5 || 4
|- 
| 2022 ||  || 11
| 19 || 32 || 26 || 203 || 87 || 290 || 79 || 37 || 1.7 || 1.4 || 10.7 || 4.6 || 15.3 || 4.2 || 1.9 || 5
|- class=sortbottom
! colspan=3 | Career
! 141 !! 221 !! 165 !! 1325 !! 646 !! 1971 !! 520 !! 378 !! 1.6 !! 1.2 !! 9.4 !! 4.6 !! 14.0 !! 3.7 !! 2.7 !! 19
|}

Honours and achievements
Team
 McClelland Trophy: 2016

Individual
 All-Australian team: 2021
 2× Sydney leading goalkicker: 2019, 2020
 Victoria representative honours in State of Origin for Bushfire Relief Match: 2020
 22under22 team: 2017
 AFL Rising Star nominee: 2016 (round 5)

References

External links

Living people
1996 births
Gippsland Power players
Sydney Swans players
Australian rules footballers from Victoria (Australia)